The  Photron FASTCAM SPECTRA  is a 256 x 256 High-speed camera coupled with an image intensifier.  The image intensifier can shutter to 20 nanoseconds and has a spectral response between 180 nm to 800 nm.  It is part of the Photron FASTCAM line of cameras, introduced in 1998.

Overview and features
The FASTCAM SPECTRA native resolution is 256 x 256 pixels x 8 bits at 4,500 FPS.  By reducing the resolution, the frame rate for recording can be increased.  As an example, 40,500 FPS is achieved with a resolution of 64 x 64 pixels at 8 bits.   The FASTCAM SPECTRA processor came with three memory configurations that allowed full frame storage of 8192 images (512 MB), 16,384 images (1GB) or 24,576 images (1.5 GB).   At 4,500 fps and maximum memory, the recording time is 5.46 seconds.  The SPECTRA image sensor reads images in blocks which is commonly called a Block Readout sensor.   The image sensor is divided into 16 blocks where each block is 256 x 16 pixels.  And within one block, one half to one fourth of the block can be partially read out.   Digital image data could be read from the Processor through a SCSI interface.  Live video images could be displayed on NTSC or PAL monitors.  Ancillary information would be display as OSD (On-Screen-Data).  The camera cable could be up to 5m from the Processor.  The system could be controlled from a computer through an RS-232 interface sending simple ASCII commands.

The FASTCAM SPECTRA  has been used in ballistic studies, combustion studies, flow visualization studies such as aerosol dispersion and many other high-speed camera applications.  Photron manufactured various version of this high-speed camera system without an intensifier(Photron Rabbit, Kodak HS4540, Photron SE and the Photron FASTCAM Ultima 40K all using the same image sensor) from 1990 to 2006.

See also 
 Photron (Photron's FASTCAM High-speed Cameras)
 High-speed photography
 High-speed camera

References

External links
 Official website (Photron)
  (FASTCAM SPECTRA)
  (Rolling vs. Global Shutter)
    (Electronic Imaging)
  (US 4322638 A - Image sensor adaptable for fast frame readout)

High-speed cameras
Digital movie cameras